The Taynal Mosque, or the Mosque of Emir Saif al-Din Taynal al-Hajib is a mosque in Tripoli, Lebanon. It is one of the most beautiful mosques in terms of architectural grandeur in the Levant region. Only second to Tripoli's Grand Mansouri Mosque in terms of socio-religious importance, the mosque stands in the middle of an orchard and visible from all sides; it's an oblong structure of sandstone. It is located south of Old Tripoli in the historic Bab al-Ramel district. 

Built in 1336, many parts of the mosque are remnants of a Crusader church built by the Carmelite Fathers during the time of the Crusades, while the Crusaders themselves had built the church on top of a Roman temple dedicated to Zeus, locally called Baal. Several medieval travelers, including the 14th-century traveler Ibn Batutah, have written eloquently about it.

The Taynal Mosque was built by the Mamluk Sultanate deputy in Tripoli, Prince (Emir) Saif al-Din Taynal al-Hajib. As previously mentioned, it was built over the ruins of a Crusader church after the liberation of Tripoli by Sultan Qalawun in 1289. Inside the mosque, there are Gothic and Corinthian crowns from the remains of an ancient temple that existed before the Crusader church. The floor of the first prayer division is of colored marble with two northern and southern domes.

The second prayer house has a pure Islamic character that begins with a magnificent marble gate, considered one of the most beautiful gates of all mosques in Tripoli and the wider Islamic world. The gate's ornate elements are kept in a very good condition because it is located inside the mosque between its two parts, unlike the gates of Tripoli's many other historic mosques. 

The main prayer hall will have an evident dome in the center lifted by four massive pillars followed by a smaller dome located over the mihrab with exquisite embellishments. The floor in the second prayer division is adorned with Islamic colored mosaics and designs.

The mihrab of the mosque is a wooden masterpiece from the Mamluk period with inscriptions that record the history of its manufacture and the name of its maker - Mohammad as-Safadi. Due to the mosque being outside the Old City, defense and military details are quite visible and appear to be almost similar to a fortress or a citadel where the minaret seems to be designed to be almost like a military tower. The walls of the mosque also have secret corridors that allow guards to take cover from danger. 

Although it is now surrounded by big buildings and roads, the mosque was surrounded by extensive orange trees and only walking distance to the Abu Ali (Kadisha) river. The mosque has a vault near the inner chapel and a marble courtyard surrounded by four rooms used by the council of  four service schools in Tripoli during the time of Mamluk and Chafi'eeh, Hanafiyyeh, Malikiyyeh, and Hanbaliyyeh. The mosque served as a center of learning at the time and continues to host events and courses related to Islamic sciences.

Gallery

References

External links

 Mosques in Tripoli, Lebanon
 Taynal Mosque

Mamluk architecture in Lebanon
Mosques in Tripoli, Lebanon
Mosque buildings with domes
Tourist attractions in Lebanon